Luis Miguel: 20 Años (also known as Gira 20 Años or Premier 1991) is a VHS Video from the Mexican singer Luis Miguel. It was recorded in 1991 during the presentations of the artist with the Gira 20 Años by various places in Mexico after the release of his last album (at that time) 20 Años.

This tour is considered to be the first grand tour by Luis Miguel, with presentations in all Mexico, and in various cities of the United States.

This video records a presentation of the artist in the now destroyed Centro de Espectaculos Premier (Premier Shows Center). The video contains around 90 minutes of the concerts, and the other 10 minutes include an interview that Luis Miguel made specially for the video. In this video Luis Miguel sang his pop songs, but the special feature of this video is that Luis Miguel sang 2 songs in Italian, and also 10 minutes of never-released songs in Trio (guitar).

Song List
Introduction
Oro de Ley
Yo Que No Vivo Sin Ti
Amante del Amor
Pupilas de Gato
Culpable O No
Hoy El Aire Huele a Tí
Más Allá de Todo
Ahora Te Puedes Marchar
Il Cielo (in Italian) (never released)
Álguien Como Tú
Entrégate
Fría Como el Viento
Stragna Gelozzia (in Italian) (never released)
Tengo Todo Excepto a Tí
Será Que No Me Amas
Trios Medley
Un Poco Más (never released)
Llévatela (never released)
El Reloj (never released)
Sabor A Mí (never released)
Contigo Aprendi (never released)
De Que Manera Te Olvido (never released)
Como Fue (never released)
Un Hombre Busca Una Mujer
La Incondicional
Cuando Calienta El Sol

Luis Miguel video albums
1991 video albums
1991 live albums
Live video albums
Warner Records video albums
Warner Records live albums